Acavus superbus is a species of air-breathing land snails, terrestrial pulmonate gastropod mollusks in the family Acavidae.

Three subspecies recognized.

Description
Acavus superbus has green colored shell and rose brown body.

Distribution
This species is endemic to Sri Lanka. It is confined to wet zone of the country.

Subspecies
Acavus superbus grevillei
Acavus superbus roseolabiatus
Acavus superbus superbus

References

External links
Population Size, Plant Occupancy and Threats to Acavus

Acavidae
Gastropods described in 1854